Nayakan is a 1985 Indian Malayalam-language film, directed by Balu Kiriyath. The film stars Mohanlal, Viji, Sankaradi and Captain Raju. The film has musical score by A. T. Ummer.

Cast
Mohanlal as Krishnadas
Viji as Parvathi
Sankaradi as Murari Dance Master
Captain Raju as Rahim
T. G. Ravi as Murugan
Pattom Sadan
Kunchan as Vyas/Vasu
Jalaja as Haseena
Vanitha Krishnachandran as Heroine
Sathaar as Ali Abdulla
Jose as Prem
Shivaji as Shivaji
James

Soundtrack
The music was composed by A. T. Ummer and the lyrics were written by Balu Kiriyath.

References

External links
 

1985 films
1980s Malayalam-language films
Films scored by A. T. Ummer